The Teller of the Receipt of the Exchequer was an office in the English Exchequer.

The Tellers of the Exchequer received any money to be paid into the Exchequer, noted the amount in a book, and sent a copy of the entry, called a Teller's Bill, to the Tally Court so that a tally could be made of it. At the end of each day, the money they had received, as determined by the Bills, was removed from their chests to be deposited in the Treasury. During the reign of Richard I, these officials numbered ten, but by the time of Henry III, they had been reduced to four, which number remained constant until the abolition of the office. With several other offices of the ancient Exchequer, that of Teller of the Receipt was done away with on 10 October 1834; the office's responsibilities were given to the new Comptroller General of the Exchequer.

Tellers of the Exchequer (1660-1834)

References

Haydn's Book of Dignities (1894)

Exchequer offices